Guaranteed Rate Field, formerly Comiskey Park and US Cellular Field is a baseball stadium located on the South Side of Chicago, Illinois, United States. It serves as the home stadium of the Chicago White Sox, one of the city's two Major League Baseball (MLB) teams, and is owned by the state of Illinois through the Illinois Sports Facilities Authority. Completed at a cost of US$137 million, the park opened as Comiskey Park on April 18, 1991, taking its name from the former ballpark at which the White Sox had played since 1910.

Guaranteed Rate Field is situated just to the west of the Dan Ryan Expressway in Chicago's Armour Square neighborhood, adjacent to the more famous neighborhood of Bridgeport. The stadium was built directly across 35th Street from the original Comiskey Park, which was demolished to make room for a parking lot for the new venue. The location of Old Comiskey's home plate is represented by a marble plaque on the sidewalk next to Guaranteed Rate Field, with the foul lines painted in the parking lot. The spectator ramp across 35th Street is designed in such a way (partly curved, partly straight but angling east-northeast) that it echoes the contour of the old first-base grandstand.

History

The stadium was the first new major sporting facility built in Chicago since Chicago Stadium in 1929. It was also the last one built before the wave of new "retro-classic" ballparks in the 1990s and 2000s.

A few design features from the old Comiskey Park were retained. The front facade of the park features arched windows. The "exploding scoreboard" pays homage to the original, installed by Bill Veeck at the old park in 1960. The original field dimensions and seating configuration were very similar to those of Royals Stadium (now Kauffman Stadium) in Kansas City, which had been the last baseball-only park built in the majors, in 1973.

As originally built, the park was criticized by many fans because of the height of the upper deck. The original architect, HOK Sport (now Populous), wanted to eliminate the overhang problems present in many stadiums built since the 1970s. With this in mind, the upper deck was set back over the lower deck, and the stands rose fairly gradually. While it gave nearly every seat in the upper level an unobstructed view of the field, it also created one of the highest upper decks in baseball. The first row of seats in the upper deck of the new stadium is as far from the field as the highest row of seats in the upper deck at the old stadium. Due to the field being practically at street level, the original upper deck made the park look like a cookie-cutter stadium from the outside. Fans sitting in this area did not get much chance for relief, as it was one of the few parks in Major League Baseball that did not allow fans sitting in the upper deck to venture anywhere else in the park, such as the lower deck concourse.

In response to fan complaints, the stadium has undergone numerous renovations since the 2001 season in order to retrofit the facility to current architectural trends. These changes have included building a multi-tiered concourse beyond center field, adjusting the fences to make the outfield less symmetrical, and most significantly, the removal of 6,600 seats at the top of the upper deck.

The uppermost tier of the park now has a white and black screen behind the top row of seats, and is topped by a flat canopy roof supported by black steel truss supports that obstruct the view of a few seats. The original blue seats were also replaced by forest green seats. The new green and black color scheme, upper level screen set back from the outer wall and canopy roof are reminiscent of the old Comiskey Park, as well as other classic baseball stadiums. Murals to the interior concourses were also added, a prominent feature of the old stadium.

The stadium houses 103 luxury suites located on two levels, as well as 1,822 "club seats" on 300-level mezzanine between the lower deck and upper deck. The club seats receive in-seat wait-staff, and benefit from an enclosed concourse with multiple television viewing areas and bar-style concessions. The stadium has 400 wheelchair-accessible seats, 38 public restrooms, 12 escalators, and 15 elevators. The new suites were one example of why the old Comiskey Park was demolished, as suites generate more revenue.

Naming rights
Originally called Comiskey Park, the stadium was renamed U.S. Cellular Field in 2003, after Chicago-based telecommunications company U.S. Cellular purchased the naming rights at US$68 million for 20 years. The stadium's current name was announced on October 31, 2016, after the Chicago-based private residential mortgage company Guaranteed Rate purchased the naming rights in a 13-year deal.

Attractions and features
Flickering LED Lights: The White Sox use the flickering LED Lights feature for whenever the team takes the field before the first pitch, hits a Home Run, or wins a game. They also used the feature for whenever their closer, Liam Hendriks, comes out of the bullpen.
Fan Deck: A panoramic view of the playing field on the two-tiered Fan Deck atop the center field concession stands. Fan Deck includes catered food and beverage service consisting of chicken sandwiches, hot dogs, hamburgers, potato chips, popcorn, beer, soda, and water. Fan deck can accommodate around 150 people.
Miller Lite Landing: A 326-seat section in right field that features running water fixtures on all four sides, individual seating, spaces for group parties and a standing room area where fans can interact near the outfield concourse. The first few rows of the section includes cushioned seats, device charging ports, television screens and more.
Craft Kave: A two-tiered, open-air section located in right field next to the visitor's bullpen with food and drinks.
Rain Rooms: A place where fans can cool off during hot game days. Near section 107 & 537.
Kids Zone: Located in left field. This  area is devoted to young White Sox fans, providing them with the opportunity to learn the fundamentals of baseball. It features a youth-sized whiffle ball diamond for coaching clinics, batting and pitching cages, batting "swing" boxes for proper batting techniques and areas for base running and skills instruction.
Speed Pitch Machines: Near section 155 and 522
Shower: A carry-over from old Comiskey Park where fans can cool off during hot gamedays. Near Section 160.
Scout Seats: Located directly behind home plate and contains 314 leather seats.
The Patio: Located just behind the right center field fence at field level. The patio serves for group outings such as the Craft Kave and can accommodate from 50 to 100 people.
Home Plate Club: Located behind home plate. Features include a restaurant buffet, open bar, open air seating in padded, extra-wide 22" seats, private restrooms, flat-screen televisions throughout the club and seating area, private elevator entrance behind home plate at Gate 4, early admittance into the ballpark for select games to watch White Sox batting practice from the outfield.

#SoxSocial Tap Room: The Tap Room is open to all guests with a game ticket until the last out of each game. The Tap Room is accessible by the stairs located outside Section 157.
Pizza Pub: Fans can enjoy pizza straight out of the oven along with full bar options and a new seating area. Located near Section 163.
Xfinity Zone: Located outside Section 109. Fans can order food and beverages, watch sports on the big screen.
47 Shop: Souvenirs, hats and apparel from years past to today. Near Section 101.
Home Plate Shop: The Home Plate Shop, offering a wide variety of White Sox merchandise, is open on game days only. Located behind home plate on the 100 Level.
New Era Cap Corner: Baseball caps of all colors, styles and sizes in a wide variety of team logos. Located on the lower level near Section 157.
Minnie Miñoso Sculpture: Located behind Section 164.
Carlton Fisk Sculpture: Located behind Section 164.
Charles Comiskey Sculpture: Located behind Section 100.
Luis Aparicio Sculpture: Located behind Section 100.
Nellie Fox Sculpture: Located behind Section 100.
Billy Pierce Sculpture: Located behind Section 164.
Harold Baines Sculpture: Located behind Section 105.
Frank Thomas Sculpture: Located behind Section 160.
Paul Konerko Sculpture: Located behind Section 160.
Jim Thome Plaque: Located on the center field fan deck. The description of the plaque reads "On June 4, 2008, Chicago White Sox slugger Jim Thome became the first player ever to hit a baseball onto the Fan Deck of U.S. Cellular Field as the Sox beat the Kansas City Royals. He duplicated the tape-measure feat on September 30, 2008 as the White Sox beat the Minnesota Twins, 1–0, in a one-game playoff to win the American League Central Division championship."
The Two Blue Seats: The seats where Paul Konerko's Grand Slam (left field in section 159) and Scott Podsednik's game-winning home run (right center first row in section 101) that landed in game two of the 2005 World Series are the same original blue seats in use at that game.
White Sox Champions Brick Plaza: Located at the main entrance to the park, (Gate 4). The plaza is dedicated to the 2005 World Series Champion White Sox and their fans. Each legacy brick is inscribed with a personalized message that has become part of a new baseball diamond-shaped plaza outside the main entrance to the ballpark. A life-sized white bronze and granite sculpture celebrating the 2005 White Sox World Series Championship that stands at the center of the plaza, with a historical timeline of the franchise along the diamond's base paths. The statue weighs over 25 tons.
Old Comiskey Park's home plate: Located just north of the park by Gate 5 in Lot B.
"ChiSox Bar and Grill": A multi-level restaurant and bar located inside of Gate 5. The establishment features both indoor and outdoor seating and a wide variety of food, drinks, and entertainment.
Chicago Sports Depot: A Chicago White Sox, Bears, Blackhawks, Bulls, and Fire merchandise store located next to ChiSox Bar and Grill at Gate 5.

Renovations and additions

1996–99
 1996 – A bullpen bar was added in right field.
 1998 – The batter's eye was painted from blue to black.
 1999 – A new Bill Veeck-esque showerhead in left field and a "Rain Room" in right field for fans to cool off during hot summertime games.

2001–07
In 2001, extensive renovations were started by HKS Sports & Entertainment Group to make the park more fan-friendly:

Phase I (2001 season)
 Three rows of nearly 2,000 seats were added along the field between the dugouts and the foul poles.
 Bullpens were relocated to allow fans to see pitchers warming up; former bullpens filled with new seats.
 Two-tiered terrace seating area added outside the Bullpen Sports Bar.
 Distances to the outfield wall were changed, most noticeably down the foul lines, where the bullpens and the Bullpen Sports Bar are now located.
 Outfield seating area extended to the fence.
 A full-service restaurant dubbed the Stadium Club was introduced with windows overlooking the right field corner.
 Capacity was increased from 44,321 to 45,936.

Phase II (2002 season)

 Old backstop with netted roof was replaced with a new "roofless" backstop which allows foul balls to drop into seats directly behind home plate.
 Multi-tiered Batter's eye built in center field.
 Main concourse upgraded with brick facade, stainless steel counter tops and decorative lighting.
 Club-level concourse enclosed and carpeted with heating, air conditioning and comfortable seating areas throughout.
 Party deck was added in center field, just below the scoreboard and above the batter's eye.

Phase III (2003 season)

 Scoreboard and video boards were upgraded.
 Full-color, high resolution 28 ×  video screen added to center field scoreboard.
 Two -long, -high video LED "ribbon" boards added along the upper deck facade.
 Design upgrades consistent with the lower deck finished on outfield and upper deck concourses.
 Fan Deck, featuring food and beverage service in an elevated patio-like atmosphere, built on center field concourse.
 Outfield steel framework and underside of canopy roof painted dark gray; concrete in seating areas and on pedestrian ramps stained gray.
 A life size bronze statue of Charles Comiskey was placed on the center field concourse behind section 100.
 Capacity is increased from 45,936 to 47,098.
 Phase III renovations cost approximately $20 million.

Phase IV (2004 season)

 Upper Deck Seating Area – Eight rows and 6,600 seats were removed from the top of the ballpark's upper deck.
 Upper Deck Concourse was partially enclosed from the weather by a translucent wall.
 Fan Deck in center field upgraded to feature tiered seating and standing room.
 Lower Terrace balcony added to provide an additional party area and outdoor seating.
 The outfield wall was redone with pictures of White Sox players who've had their number retired.
 A life sized bronze statue of Minnie Miñoso placed on the center field concourse behind section 164.
 Capacity is decreased from 47,098 to 40,615.
 Phase IV renovations cost approximately $28 million.

Phase V (2005 season)

 314-seat "Scout" seating area directly behind home plate added.
 FUNdamentals Deck, an area for kids to work on various baseball skills, was added above the left field concourse.
 Green seats, modeled after those in the original Comiskey Park, replaced the old blue seats in the Club level and some scattered areas around home plate. The bleachers in left-center field were painted green.
 A bronze statue of Carlton Fisk was placed on the center field concourse behind section 164 on August 7.

Phase VI (2006 season)
 Green seats reminiscent of those in the original Comiskey Park replaced the old blue seats in the entire Upper Deck and the Lower Deck between the dugouts.
 Enclosed, ground level restaurant was completed, providing a lounge and dining area for the Scout Seats.
 New banners were hung down on the outfield light towers. One for the 2005 World Series, one for the 1906 and 1917 World Series, one for all White Sox American League pennants, and one for all the division championships.
 The flags for these titles, now on the banners, were replaced with flags of all the Sox logos in club history.
 Bronze statues of Nellie Fox and Luis Aparicio were placed on the center field concourse behind section 100.

Phase VII (2007 season)

 Green seats replaced the old blue seats in the Lower Deck from the dugouts and the entire outfield seating area (including the left-center field bleachers which were previously renovated). The green seats between the dugout and the foul poles have been slightly turned, re-directing them toward the center of the field. (Visually Re-Directed Seats)
 The seats where Paul Konerko's Grand Slam (left field) and Scott Podsednik's walk off home run (right center first row) landed in game two of the 2005 World Series are the same original blue seats in use at that game and stand out from the all-green seats.
 The Scoreboard in right field was painted green.
 A new premium seating/restaurant named the Jim Beam Club (known as the Home Plate Club as of 2014) was added in the former press box behind home plate on the stadium's Diamond Suites 200 Level.
 A new press box was added on the first base side on the Diamond Suites 400 Level. The facility features 32 flat-screen televisions, wireless internet access and seating for 100 working members of the media.
 A new custom T-shirt shop was added.
 A bronze statue of Billy Pierce was placed on the center field concourse behind section 164 on July 23.
 A Thome Ticker counting down to Jim Thome's 500th career home run (hit on September 16 against the Los Angeles Angels of Anaheim). The ticker was located in right field on the right advertising board, and was taken down after the 2007 season.
 The beginning of the White Sox Champions brick plaza in front of the stadium (Gate 4) and Phase I of brick sales.

Extensive renovations (2008–present)
Renovations were added that were not part of the original plan:

2008 season

 The Illinois Sports Facilities Authority unveiled the first environmentally friendly permeable paving parking lot to be used by a Major League sports facility on April 8. The new lot (Lot L) saves taxpayer money by substantially reducing the amount of water entering Chicago's stormwater system, improving overall water quality and help reduce the Urban heat island effect.
 The White Sox Legacy Brick Program unveiled its brick plaza outside Gate 4 on April 11. Each Legacy Brick is inscribed with a personalized message and has become part of a new baseball diamond-shaped plaza outside the main entrance to the ballpark. A white, bronze and granite sculpture weighing over 25 tons that celebrates the 2005 White Sox World Series championship stands at the center of the plaza, with a historical timeline of the franchise along the diamond's base paths. Players on the sculpture from the 2005 team are Paul Konerko, Joe Crede, Orlando Hernández, Geoff Blum, and Juan Uribe.
 Plasma flatscreen television sets were added throughout the outfield concourse and at the top of its beer concession stands.
 A bronze statue of Harold Baines was placed on the right field concourse behind Section 105 on July 20.

2009 season

 About $15 million in renovations were made to Gate 5 (north of 35th Street) to improve access to the park. The demolition (beginning of November 2008) of the easternmost portion of the pedestrian ramp and removal of the top two levels of the easternmost foot bridge across 35th Street, reducing it to one level with continuing access to the park on the main concourse level. The project also included installation of escalators in a new, weather-protected enclosure and installation of elevators which provide additional access for fans with disabilities. The project was completed by opening day on April 7, when the White Sox defeated the Kansas City Royals 4–2.
 Inside the park, a new scoreboard (23 ft x 68 ft) with 913,000 LED lights (similar to Tropicana Field) replaced the older out-of-town scoreboard in right field. In addition to displaying both lineups (that of the Sox and their opponents) the board showed season stats for the current batter and pitcher. It also served as an upgrade to the old "around-the-league" scoreboard that it replaced. While the old scoreboard showed only the current innings, scores, and pitchers' jersey numbers, the new board was capable of showing balls, strikes, outs, locations of any baserunners, and the current batter and pitcher by last name instead of by number. A slight disadvantage is that the new board only showed four games at a time in this manner, whereas the old board showed every game in progress simultaneously.
 A small plaque honoring Jim Thome located on the center field fan deck for his  home run shot that landed there, becoming the first player ever to do so on June 4, 2008. The White Sox defeated the Royals in that game. Thome duplicated this feat again on September 30, 2008, in a one-game playoff against AL Central rival Minnesota Twins. His home run proved to be the game winner in a 1–0 shutout to win the AL Central.
 For White Sox players, a new hydrotherapy room with three combinational hot-and-cold whirlpool tubs. An underwater treadmill that can curb problems relating to the abdominals, back and knee and strengthens the muscles and hip, is installed in one of the tubs.
 "The Catch" was written on the left-center field wall above Billy Pierce's image (now above a blank wall), at the location where DeWayne Wise made a catch to rob Gabe Kapler of a 9th-inning home run and ensure Mark Buehrle's perfect game on July 23, 2009.

2010–present
2010 season
 A new outdoor Beer Garden named "TBD's" was installed by July 26 (when the White Sox hosted the Seattle Mariners) at Gate 5. The area served beer, wine, soda, and water, and also had 12 flat-screen TVs. TBD's was taken down and replaced by "ChiSox Bar and Grill" in 2011. The restaurant was open at 11 AM on gamedays. Although it is technically outside the park and accessible with or without a game ticket, fans must be 21 or older to enter. Home Plate Club opens behind home plate
 Frank Thomas' number and picture were added to the outfield wall as his number was retired.

2011 season

 A new Metra station (Jones/Bronzeville) on the Rock Island line (designed by Infrastructure Engineering, Inc.) worth $7.9 million was planned to be opened in 2009, but due to a year-long delay of construction, the station opened in 2011 after groundbreaking on June 29, 2009. The new station is located East of the ballpark just beyond the I-90/I-94 Dan Ryan Expressway.
 A multi-level restaurant and bar inside Gate 5 called "ChiSox Bar and Grill" (formerly known as Bacardi at the Park).  The establishment features both indoor and outdoor seating and a wide variety of food, drinks, and entertainment for Guaranteed Rate Field guests that started in April 2011. "ChiSox Bar and Grill" is open during the baseball season, but plans made the restaurant and bar a year-round establishment.

 A bronze statue of Frank Thomas was unveiled on July 31, against the Boston Red Sox. It is the eighth statue to be placed on the outfield concourse.

2012 season
 Chicago Sports Depot, a new merchandise store, opened on November 19, 2011, right next to Gate 5 and ChiSox Bar and Grill.

2014 season
 A bronze statue of Paul Konerko was unveiled on September 27, against the Kansas City Royals. It is the ninth statue to be placed on the outfield concourse.

2016 season

 Three new HD video boards were installed before the start of the 2016 season at a cost of $7.3 million. The auxiliary boards in left and right field, and the main video board in center, were all replaced with new HD screens. The project was funded via the Sox' capital repairs budget.

2018 season
 The visitor's clubhouse was renovated to meet up to date technology.
 A virtual reality home run derby batting cage was installed in the Chicago Sports Depot.
 A new LED ribbon board was extended to run the entire length of the grandstand, meaning the retired numbers that resided behind home plate had to be moved to the first and third-base lines.

2019 season
 A 326-seat section dubbed "The Goose Island" (now known as the "Miller Lite Landing") replaced sections 106 and 107 in right field. The section includes running water fixtures on all four sides to create the "island" of beer and baseball. The section also features individual seating, spaces for group parties and a standing room area where fans can interact near the outfield concourse. The first few rows of the section will also provide a "modernized" game day experience with cushioned seats, device charging ports, television screens and more. The revamped section expanded the presence of Goose Island, which is owned by beverage conglomerate Anheuser-Busch InBev, inside the stadium. The previously known Craft Cave became the Goose Island Craft Cave. Formerly a  Goose Island tap statue overlooked the stadium from the special section. The section opened by opening day on April 4.
 An extension of the safety netting from the dugouts to foul poles was completed during the 2019 season.

2021 season
 The White Sox added the flickering LED lights for whenever the team either comes out of their dugout before the first pitch, hits a home run, wins a game, or whenever their closer Liam Hendriks comes out of the bullpen.

Retired numbers
There are 12 retired numbers on the facade of the 1st and 3rd base sides of the 300 level.

Ballpark firsts

Opening Day (April 18, 1991)

Batting

Pitching

Other firsts

Transportation and entry gates

Guaranteed Rate Field can be reached by using the CTA's "L" Rapid Transit system. The stadium's station stops are Sox–35th for the Red Line and 35-Bronzeville-IIT for the Green Line. The Red Line is also used by Cubs fans to reach Wrigley Field (Addison Station) on the North side of Chicago. (When the White Sox take on the Cubs every year, usually in June, many fans will use the Red-Line to get to the games. The series is dubbed the Cross-Town Classic or the Windy City Showdown.) 

A new Metra station (35th Street), which helps fans with more accessibility, opened on the Rock Island line in 2011. It is also accessible by CTA bus route #35 (31st/35th Street) and the suburban Pace Guaranteed Rate Field Express shuttle service.

Guaranteed Rate is just west of the I-90/94 Dan Ryan Expressway. The "Dan Ryan" was under construction in 2006–2007 in hopes of relieving traffic congestion.

The ballpark has eight main parking lots.

The ballpark has seven main entrances:
 Gate 1 is located on the South side of the park in right field
 Gate 2 is located on the Southwest side of the park down the right field 
 Gate 3 is located on the West side of the park on the 1st 
  Gate 4 is on the Northwest side of the park behind home 
  Gate 5 is located on the North side of the park on the 3rd base 
 Gate 6 is located on the Northeast side of the park down the left field 
 Gate 7 is located on the East side of the park in left field.

The main level is accessible only to fans who have a ticket to a seat in the lower level.

Notable games/events

1990s
April 18, 1991: The inaugural game of the ballpark. The White Sox were defeated by the Detroit Tigers 16–0. Attendance: 42,191
April 22, 1991: Frank Thomas hits the first White Sox home run in new Comiskey Park as the Sox defeat the Baltimore Orioles, 8–7, in the first night contest in the new ballpark. Attendance: (30,480)
October 5, 1993: New Comiskey hosted its first ever playoff game, game 1 of the 1993 ALCS. The Sox lost to the Toronto Blue Jays, 7–3. The park also played host to games 2 and 6 of the series, which the Sox lost, four games to two. Attendance: (46,246)
September 14, 1997: Carlton Fisk's number 72 was retired by the White Sox as the Sox played the Cleveland Indians. The Sox would lose 8–3. Attendance: (32,485)

2000s
September 13, 2002: The Rolling Stones, on their Licks Tour, play the first-ever concert held in the stadium.
July 15, 2003: The stadium hosts the 74th MLB All-Star Game. The first All-Star game was played at Comiskey Park in 1933. Attendance: (47,609)
September 13–14, 2004: U.S. Cellular Field hosts two games between the Florida Marlins and the Montreal Expos, due to Hurricane Ivan in Florida. The Marlins sweep by scores of 6–3 and 8–6. The series would return to Florida to finish the last three games, with the Expos taking two. Game 1 attendance: (4,003). Game 2 attendance: (5,457)
August 7, 2005: A life-sized bronze statue of catcher Carlton Fisk is unveiled on the center-field concourse behind section 164. The White Sox defeat the Seattle Mariners 3–1. Attendance: (35,706)
October 22, 2005: The first ever World Series game in this stadium. Luis Aparicio throws the ceremonial first pitch, then is joined by 1959 World Series teammates Jim Landis, J. C. Martin, Billy Pierce and Bob Shaw on the field. Josh Groban sings the national anthem. Craig Biggio of the Houston Astros is the game's first batter. Jermaine Dye's first-inning home run off Roger Clemens provides the game's first hit and run. The White Sox get their first World Series game victory since 1959, defeating the Houston Astros 5–3. Attendance: (41,206)
October 28, 2005: After winning the 2005 World Series, the team's victory parade begins at U.S. Cellular Field, players boarding double-decker buses that travel north to downtown Chicago. A throng estimated at more than 200,000 celebrates the first White Sox championship since 1917.
April 2, 2006: The Sox open the 2006 season with the unveiling of their 2005 World Series Championship banner on the left-center light tower. Three other banners are placed on the other light towers: One for the 1906 and 1917 World Series championships by the Sox on the far left tower. The one on the right-center tower is for all the team's American League Championships. The one on the far right is for all the division championships. The Sox defeat the Cleveland Indians 10–4. Attendance: (38,802)
April 8, 2008: The Illinois Sports Facilities Authority unveil the first environmentally friendly permeable paving parking lot to be used by a Major League sports facility in parking lot L.
April 11, 2008: The White Sox dedicate their new brick plaza to the 2005 World Series Champions and their fans. The Sox are defeated by the Detroit Tigers 5–2. Attendance: (26,094)
July 20, 2008: A life-sized bronze statue of Harold Baines is unveiled on the center-field concourse behind section 105. The Sox are defeated by the Kansas City Royals 8–7 and Jim Thome of the Sox collects his 2,000th career hit. Attendance: (32,269)
January 20, 2009: The White Sox display a banner outside of Gate 6 to honor White Sox fan Barack Obama's presidential inauguration.
July 23, 2009: The first perfect game and second no-hitter at U.S. Cellular Field. Mark Buehrle strikes out six batters and records 11 ground ball outs to get a perfect game against the Tampa Bay Rays. It is the second no-hitter of Buehrle's career, the last occurring on April 18, 2007, against the Texas Rangers. He is the first player since Hideo Nomo to throw multiple no-hitters, and the first to throw a perfect game since Randy Johnson did it May 18, 2004 against the Atlanta Braves at Turner Field. In a remarkable coincidence, Buehrle's first no-hitter was 2 hours and 3 minutes and Buehrle's second was just as long. Another coincidence was home plate umpire (#56, same as Buehrle's) Eric Cooper who called both Buehrle's no-hitters. Yet another coincidence is that Ramón Castro, who caught for Buehrle, wears the No. 27 on his jersey, the number of consecutive outs needed for a perfect game. It was also Cooper's third no-hitter called with his first one with Hideo Nomo on April 4, 2001. Attendance: (28,036)

2010s
August 29, 2010: The White Sox host Frank Thomas Day at the ballpark against the New York Yankees. Thomas's jersey is retired, along with his image posted on the legends' wall in left-center field next to Billy Pierce on his left and Carlton Fisk on his right, and also right under "The Catch" logo. Yankees defeat the Sox 2–1. Attendance: (39,433)
July 31, 2011: The White Sox unveil a replica statue of Frank Thomas on the outfield concourse behind section 160. The White Sox lose to the Boston Red Sox 5–3. Attendance: (28,278)
September 27, 2014: Paul Konerko is honored before the game for his retirement from baseball. A statue of him is unveiled on the left-field concourse next to Frank Thomas' Statue. Konerko was the last member of the 2005 Champion White Sox left on the team at the time of his retirement. The Sox defeat the Kansas City Royals 5–4. Attendance: (38,160)
May 23, 2015: Paul Konerko's number 14 is retired by the White Sox with a pregame ceremony. He became the 10th player to have his number retired by the White Sox. The White Sox were defeated by the Minnesota Twins 4–3. Attendance: (38,714)
June 24, 2017: Mark Buehrle's number 56 is retired by the White Sox with a pregame ceremony. Buehrle becomes the 11th player in White Sox history to have a retired number. The White Sox were defeated by the Oakland Athletics 10–2. Attendance: (38,618)

2020s
May 25, 2021: Long time Major League Baseball umpire Joe West umpired his 5,376th game passing Bill Klem for most games ever umpired. Attendance: (16,380) Limited in–person attendance due to COVID-19 pandemic.

White Sox record at home

Notes: 1994 season incomplete due to Players Strike. Only 113 games played. Only 144 games played in 1995. Only 161 games played in 1997, 1999 & 2019. 163 games played in 2008 due to AL Central division tie-breaker game.

Only 60 games played in 2020 due to the COVID-19 pandemic.

80 home games played at Guaranteed Rate Field in 2021 with 1 played at Field of Dreams.

Attendance

Non-baseball events

Concerts

Football

In film and other media
Guaranteed Rate Field has appeared in films such as Rookie of the Year (1993), Major League II (1994), Little Big League (1994), My Best Friend's Wedding (1997), and The Ladies Man (2000). In Rookie of the Year, the stadium played the role of Dodger Stadium, and in Little Big League, it played the role of all opposing ballparks except for Yankee Stadium and Fenway Park. Commercials for the PGA Tour, Nike, Reebok, and the Boys & Girls Clubs of America have been filmed at the park.

See also

Gene Honda – Public address announcer for the White Sox, DePaul Basketball, Chicago Blackhawks, Illinois Football, and the NCAA Men's Division I Basketball Championship Final Four.
Roger Bossard – Head groundskeeper for the White Sox. (1983–present)
Nancy Faust – Long-time stadium organist for the White Sox. (1970–2010)
Southpaw – White Sox mascot.
Camelback Ranch – The spring training home of the White Sox shared with the Los Angeles Dodgers. (2009–present)

Notes
Nathaniel Whalen, "Marked seats meaningful to Sox stars", Post Tribune, March 30, 2007

References

External links

Stadium site on MLB.com
ISFAuthority.com
Andrewclem.com
Ballparksofbaseball.com
Ballparks.com
Aerial view of Guaranteed Rate Field
 Guaranteed Rate Field Seating Chart

Chicago White Sox stadiums
Major League Baseball venues
Baseball venues in Chicago
Sports venues completed in 1991
1991 establishments in Illinois
Populous (company) buildings
Armour Square, Chicago